Pillow to Post is a 1945 romantic comedy film directed by Vincent Sherman, starring Ida Lupino, Sydney Greenstreet and William Prince. Based on the play Pillar to Post by Rose Simon Kohn, it is about a tired traveling saleswoman who goes to great lengths to find a place to sleep during the World War II housing shortage.

Plot
Socialite Jean Howard (Ida Lupino) is stirred to patriotism and eager to help the war effort. When she overhears her father, J. R. Howard (an uncredited Paul Harvey), complain that the military has taken all of the salesmen of his oil rig supply company, she volunteers to take their place. J. R. gives in, though he reminds her that she has never worked a day in her life.

On one business trip, she arrives at a town where the only available place to sleep is a bungalow reserved for married couples. When she is mistaken for the war bride of a lieutenant, she goes along. To register at the Colonial Auto Court, however, she has to produce her "husband". She persuades a very reluctant Lieutenant Don Mallory (William Prince) to help her out, promising it will only take a few minutes of his day off. The couple become trapped in their masquerade as newlyweds when they run into Don's commanding officer, Colonel Michael Otley (Sydney Greenstreet), who lives just a few doors down with his wife.

When Jean goes out to see prospective customer Earl "Slim" Clark (Johnny Mitchell), he insists on taking her out to dinner to discuss the deal. To maintain appearances, Don goes along. The dinner does not go well. While trying to restrain a drunk acquaintance, Slim accidentally knocks Don out and is himself rendered unconscious by the drunk man.

When they return to the auto court, Don and Jean have to sleep under the same roof on their "wedding night". He gives her the bed and sleeps first in the kitchen, which proves too uncomfortable, so he goes outdoors.

Complications ensue when Otley takes an interest in the couple and insists that Don make Jean the beneficiary of his insurance policy and allot her part of his pay. Don's mother also arrives for an early unexpected visit.

During a dinner party given by the Otleys for the couple, the colonel mentions to Jean the impending court martial of another lieutenant who lied about being married. Alarmed, she drinks too much sherry to steady her nerves. While drunk, she privately reveals to Don that she has fallen in love with him.

The charade is finally revealed when the colonel and Don's mother meet. Jean's father also joins the festivities. Fortunately, Lucille (Willie Best), a male auto court employee, tells Otley that he did see Don sleep outside, so the colonel does not press charges. Don decides the thing to do is to get married for real, much to Jean's delight.

Cast
 Ida Lupino as Jean Howard
 Sydney Greenstreet as Colonel Michael Otley
 William Prince as Lieutenant Don Mallory
 Stuart Erwin as Captain Jack Ross
 Johnny Mitchell as Earl "Slim" Clark
 Ruth Donnelly as Mrs. Grace Wingate, manager of the auto court
 Barbara Brown as Mrs. Kate Otley, the colonel's wife
 Frank Orth as Taxi Driver
 Regina Wallace as Mrs. Mallory, Don's mother
 Willie Best as Lucille
 Louis Armstrong and His Orchestra as Themselves at the Tavern
 Dorothy Dandridge appeared as the featured performer

Robert Blake has an uncredited role as a brat at the auto court who likes to drop water bombs on unsuspecting passersby.

References

External links
 
 
 
 

1945 films
1945 romantic comedy films
American romantic comedy films
American black-and-white films
American films based on plays
Films directed by Vincent Sherman
Films scored by Friedrich Hollaender
Films set on the home front during World War II
Military humor in film
Warner Bros. films
World War II films made in wartime
1940s English-language films